The vector projection of a vector  on (or onto) a nonzero vector , sometimes denoted  (also known as the vector component or vector resolution of  in the direction of ), is the orthogonal projection of  onto a straight line parallel to .

In turn, the scalar projection is defined as:

Which finally gives:

Notation
Typically, a vector projection is denoted in a bold font (e.g. ), and the corresponding scalar projection with normal font (e.g. a1). In some cases, especially in handwriting, the vector projection is also denoted using a diacritic above or below the letter (e.g.,  or a1).

Definitions based on angle θ

Scalar projection

A scalar projection can be used as a scale factor to compute the corresponding vector projection.

Vector projection
Namely, it is defined as

Vector rejection

Hence,

Definitions in terms of a and b

Scalar projection
By the above-mentioned property of the dot product, the definition of the scalar projection becomes:

In two dimensions, this becomes

Vector projection
Similarly, the definition of the vector projection of  onto  becomes:

which is equivalent to either

or

Scalar rejection
In two dimensions, the scalar rejection is equivalent to the projection of  onto , which is  rotated 90° to the left. Hence,

Such a dot product is called the "perp dot product."

Vector rejection
By definition,

Hence,

Properties

Scalar projection

It coincides with the length  of the vector projection if the angle is smaller than 90°. More exactly:
  if ,
  if .

Vector projection
More exactly:
  if ,
  and  have the same direction if ,
  and  have opposite directions if .

Vector rejection
More exactly:
  is orthogonal to  if ,

Matrix representation
The orthogonal projection can be represented by a projection matrix. To project a vector onto the unit vector , it would need to be multiplied with this projection matrix:

Uses
The vector projection is an important operation in the Gram–Schmidt orthonormalization of vector space bases. It is also used in the separating axis theorem to detect whether two convex shapes intersect.

Generalizations
Since the notions of vector length and angle between vectors can be generalized to any n-dimensional inner product space, this is also true for the notions of orthogonal projection of a vector, projection of a vector onto another, and rejection of a vector from another.

In some cases, the inner product coincides with the dot product. Whenever they don't coincide, the inner product is used instead of the dot product in the formal definitions of projection and rejection. For a three-dimensional inner product space, the notions of projection of a vector onto another and rejection of a vector from another can be generalized to the notions of projection of a vector onto a plane, and rejection of a vector from a plane. The projection of a vector on a plane is its orthogonal projection on that plane. The rejection of a vector from a plane is its orthogonal projection on a straight line which is orthogonal to that plane. Both are vectors. The first is parallel to the plane, the second is orthogonal.

For a given vector and plane, the sum of projection and rejection is equal to the original vector. Similarly, for inner product spaces with more than three dimensions, the notions of projection onto a vector and rejection from a vector can be generalized to the notions of projection onto a hyperplane, and rejection from a hyperplane. In geometric algebra, they can be further generalized to the notions of projection and rejection of a general multivector onto/from any invertible k-blade.

See also
Scalar projection
Vector notation

References

External links
 Projection of a vector onto a plane

Operations on vectors
Transformation (function)
Functions and mappings